Lisae Agerer (born 1 November 1991) is an Italian female alpine skier, who won the Alpine Skiing Europa Cup in 2012.

Biography
She won the silver medal in the giant slalom at the World Junior Alpine Skiing Championships 2011. In the Alpine Ski World Cup her best result was the 7th place in the giant slalom of Åre in 2012.

Europa Cup results
Agerer has won an overall Europa Cup and 3 specialty standings.

FIS Alpine Ski Europa Cup
Overall: 2012
Downhill: 2012
Giant Slalom: 2011, 2012

References

External links
 

1991 births
Living people
Italian female alpine skiers
Alpine skiers of Gruppo Sportivo Forestale
Alpine skiers of Centro Sportivo Carabinieri